The Thai FA Cup 2013 is the 20th season of Thailand knockout football competition. The tournament is organized by the Football Association of Thailand.

The cup winner is guaranteed a place in the  2014 AFC Champions League Play-off.

Calendar

1st qualifying round

2nd qualifying round

|colspan="3" style="background-color:#99CCCC"|3 April 2013

|-

|-

|-

|-

|-

|-

|-

|-

|-
{{OneLegResult|''Prachuap|| 1–0 |Phang Nga}}
|-

|-

|-

|}

 1 Samut Sakhon Boorana won because Phayao withdrew
 2 Lampang won because Pluak Daeng withdrew

First round

|colspan="3" style="background-color:#99CCCC"|10 April 2013'''

|-

|-

|-

|-

|-

|-

|-

|-

|-

|}

 1 Nara United won because Samut Sakorn Boorana refused to travel to the deep south and therefore forfeited the tie
 2 Phattalung won because Mukdahan withdrew

Second round

Third round

 1 Bangkok won because Sisaket was suspended
 2 Match was abandoned at 45' (1–0) due to floodlight failure; completed on June 27

Fourth round

Quarterfinals

Semifinals

Final

Thai FA Cup seasons
1